This is a list of bands that play death-doom, a fusion of death metal and doom metal.

List of bands

References 

Lists of doom metal bands
Lists of death metal bands